J. Otis Humphrey (December 30, 1850 – June 14, 1918) was an American lawyer and jurist who served as a United States district judge of the United States District Court for the Southern District of Illinois from 1901 to 1918.

Education and career

Born in Morgan County, Illinois, Humphrey attended Shurtleff College, and read law to enter the bar in 1880. He was a legal clerk for the Illinois State Office of Railroad and Warehouse Commissioners from 1880 to 1883. He was in private practice in Springfield, Illinois from 1883 to 1897. He was then the United States Attorney for the Southern District of Illinois from 1897 to 1901.

Federal judicial service

On March 7, 1901, Humphrey was nominated by President William McKinley to a seat on the United States District Court for the Southern District of Illinois vacated by Judge William J. Allen. Humphrey was confirmed by the United States Senate on March 8, 1901, and received his commission the same day. Humphrey served in that capacity until his death on June 14, 1918.

References

Sources

External links
 

1850 births
1918 deaths
United States Attorneys for the Southern District of Illinois
Judges of the United States District Court for the Southern District of Illinois
United States federal judges appointed by William McKinley
19th-century American politicians
United States federal judges admitted to the practice of law by reading law